Mohammed Qabel Mahdi (born 9 January 1988 in Iraq) is an Iraqi football defender. He currently plays for the Karbalaa FC football club in Iraq.

External links

Profile on Goalzz.com

References

Iraqi footballers
Iraq international footballers
Living people
1988 births
Association football defenders